Aquarium of the Bay is a public aquarium located at The Embarcadero and Beach Street, at the edge of Pier 39 in San Francisco, California. The aquarium is focused on local aquatic animals from the San Francisco Bay and neighboring rivers and watersheds as far as the Sierra Mountains. 
Since 2005 the Aquarium has focused its mission on enabling ocean conservation and climate action both locally and globally. It is one of seven institutions under parent company Bay Ecotarium, the largest watershed conservation organization in the Bay Area

The Aquarium of the Bay is a Smithsonian Affiliate, accredited by Association of Zoos and Aquariums (AZA) and certified as a Green Business by the city of San Francisco. It contains over 750,000 gallons of salt water that over 24,000 animals from 200+ species call home. It is the only Smithsonian-affiliated aquarium in the state of California.

History

Initial plans

The aquarium was originally scheduled to be opened in the summer of 1988, but construction on the aquarium was delayed due to protests from merchants on Fisherman's Wharf and San Francisco Bay environmental groups, and ground was not broken until July 1995. Specific objections included the amount of fill required (an additional  would need to be reclaimed from the Bay) and a potential violation of the city's 1990 Proposition H, which prohibits nonmaritime use of waterfront property. The aquarium was privately owned by a partnership of Questar of New Zealand, Aquabay Inc., and Pedersen Associates (The Chronicle Publishing Company, which owned the San Francisco Chronicle, was a minority partner in Pedersen).

Original estimates for attendance in the final environmental impact report ranged up to 28,000 daily visitors on the weekend in its inaugural year, and the aquarium was forced to limit attendance to no more than 12,600 visitors per day to gain approval. Some of the conditions imposed by the Bay Conservation and Development Commission when it issued the permits included requirements to use only species found in San Francisco Bay and to provide educational and outreach programs. In addition, the aquarium was forced to rent overflow parking spaces at Levi's Plaza and pay subsidies to Muni to fund additional buses to Pier 39 to handle the expected crowds. Together, these traffic abatement measures would cost the aquarium  in 1996. Willie Brown was involved in the negotiations leading to the annual payments.

Opened as UnderWater World

The signature attraction, two long acrylic underwater tunnels with approximately 770,000 total gallons of San Francisco Bay salt water. It includes sharks, bat rays, rock fish, and two giant sea bass.

Fifteen months after opening, attendance was poor, with only 3,500 tickets sold per day on average (2,800 to 3,900 per day during the summer of 1996, reaching a peak of 5,700 on 4 July 1996), far fewer than original estimates of 9,100 daily tickets in a building with a capacity of 12,600 daily visitors. Despite these measures, attendance remained poor and some unimpressed visitors quipped the aquarium should be renamed "Underwhelming World." Other visitors were confused by the aquarium's content, which had no whales or large sharks despite large exterior murals featuring the same. UnderWater World filed for Chapter 11 bankruptcy on 10 March 1999.

Renamed to Aquarium of the Bay
UnderWater World was sold to a group led by BNP Paribas in June 2000, who announced plans to rename it to Aquarium of the Bay and add more sea animals in 2001. Attendance had continued to decline down to approximately 1,000 daily visitors in 2001. The original aquarium was remodeled at a cost of nearly $2 million and relaunched as Aquarium of the Bay during a private party on the evening of 12 July 2001.

Under its new name, Aquarium of the Bay added new attractions and had 273 species and more than 60,000 fish in 2001.

Repairs and Renovations  
Since its opening in 1996, Aquarium of the Bay started to see the original infrastructure deteriorate and need repairs. In 2020, many of those issues were addressed. They installed a new jellyfish culture/rearing system to ensure a healthy population in the aquarium, as well as donate to other affiliated organizations. Also included in the necessary upgrades were the elevators, raw water pumps, sprinklers, and a new chiller compressor to regulate tank temperatures.

Education 
Of the varied education programs, Aquarium of the Bay has hosted educational activities for more than 220,000 local students and teachers. The educational programs primarily focus around the themes of ocean conservation, climate change action, habitat protection.

High School Internship Program 
The aquarium received funding from the San Francisco Public Utilities Commission (SFPUC) to create an internship program for select high schools. Throughout the Coronavirus pandemic in 2020, this program had to be moved to a virtual setting. The internships involved different aspects under the aquarium umbrella like social media management, as well as teaching students essential career-building skills such as writing resumes, interview techniques, and presentation skills. By the end of the program, the students culminated their newfound skills, created and shared a presentation on their climate project.

K-12 Field Trips 
Within some of the education and outreach programs for schools, the Aquarium of the Bay offers field trips that support Next Generation Science Standards (NGSS). Some programs are offered on a scholarship basis for Title 1 schools, and are otherwise free of charge for self-guided tours.

Bay Academy 
The aquarium offers several classroom programs for children of varying ages. For kindergarteners, they offer "Between the Tides," which is a program in which the children explore the tidepools along the Bay Area coastline. For 1st through 3rd graders, the aquarium offers a program to teach them about the life cycle of a salmon from egg to adulthood in the San Francisco Bay, Pacific Ocean, and rivers of California. They also offer virtual lessons over Zoom for all ages K-12.

Project WATERS 
Short for Watershed and Trout Education for Regional Stewardship, in which classes from San Francisco can host and learn about rainbow trout in their classroom.

Nonprofit Education and Research Center 
After restoring the aquarium to solvency, BNP Paribas put the Aquarium of the Bay up for sale in August 2005. The Bay Institute was approached to potentially enter a partnership prior to the sale, but the Institute did not have the funds required to purchase the aquarium outright. A local businessman, Darius Anderson, owner of Kenwood Investments, put up the funds to create a competitive bid, with a condition allowing The Bay Institute to purchase it from Kenwood Investments in a few years' time at a predetermined price, which would eventually transform the aquarium's mission from entertainment to a nonprofit education and research center.

Bids were presented to the Bay Conservation and Development Commission in November 2005, whose executive director Will Travis stated all bidders agreed to comply with prior permit conditions (only Bay species, education and outreach mission). The Bay Institute/Kenwood Investments offer was selected in June 2006, beating out a competing bid from Ripley Entertainment and a late bid from Merlin Entertainments.

Animals

Sea Lions in San Francisco 
Along the Embarcadero and other spots around San Francisco, hand-painted, life-size sea lion statues made of carbon fiber can be found. These were made as part of a celebration of the 30 years since sea lions started appearing on docks near Pier 39. After the Loma Prieta earthquake hit San Francisco, the lions bravely and mysteriously started to bask in the sun on the K-dock on their pier. Since then, they have made a permanent home of the docks. Aquarium of the Bay commissioned 30 local artists to paint unique carbon fiber sea lions in Sausalito before taking them out and placing them in various locations around San Francisco for people to find as an homage to the now long-time residents.

Sharks 
Aquarium of the Bay is the first institute in the United States to successfully breed healthy Pacific Angel Sharks. Aquarium biologists have published several papers and hosted numerous conferences on best practices for taking care of this specific breed.

The aquarium has over 50 sharks from species such as:
The Aquarium is currently conducting research to assess population status of the Broadnose Sevengill breed in the San Francisco Bay with the help of other institutions.
 Leopard shark (Triakis semifasciata)
 Soupfin (Galeorhinus galeus)
 Swell shark (Cephaloscyllium ventriosum)

The aquarium also has skates, bat rays and thousands of other animals including eels, flatfish, rockfish, wrasse, gobies, kelpfish, pricklebacks, sculpin and sturgeons.

A river otter exhibit opened on June 28, 2013. Snow is placed in the otter enclosure periodically during the winter during what are called "Otter Snow Days".

Moon Jellies 
Aquarium of the Bay's moon jellies have all been born and raised on site. The program has been running since 1998.

25 New Species to Celebrate 25 years (April 2021) 
Black Pyramid Butterflyfish (Hemitaurichthys zoster)

Duncan Coral (Duncanopsammia axifuga)

Yellow Scroll Coral (Turbinaria reniformis)

Cauliflower Coral (Pocillopora damicornis)

Spiny Lobster (Panulirus interruptus)

Sheep Crab (Loxorhynchus grandis)

Mosshead Sculpin (Clinocottus globiceps)

Giant Keyhole Limpet (Meghthura crenulata)

Giant Rock Scallops (Crassadoma gigantea)

Buffalo Sculpin (Enophrys bison)

Feather Duster Worms (Eudistylia vancouveri)

Orange Sea Cucumber (Cucumaria miniata)

Feather Star (Florometra serratissima)

Orange Sea Pen (Ptilosarcus gurneyi)

Decorated Warbonnet (Chirolophis decoratus)

Puget Sound King Crab (Lopholithodes mandtii)

Rhinoceros Crab (Rhinolithodes wosnessenskii)

Purple Globe Crab (Randallia ornata)

White Sea Pen (Stylatula elongata)

CA Golden Gorgonian (Muricea californica)

Chinook Salmon (Oncorhynchus tshawytscha)

Lingcod (Ophiodon elongatus)

CA Sea Hare (Aplysia californica)

Starry Flounder (Platichthys stellatus)

Eastern Pacific Red Octopus (Octopus rubescens)

Research Activities 
Since coming under the control of The Bay Institute, Aquarium of the Bay staff have assisted in tagging sevengill sharks in an effort to study the life and activities of the species, which has a nursery ground in San Francisco Bay. Aquarium of the Bay has collaborated with a researcher named Matt Savoca at UC Davis to study olfactory reception in anchovies and plastic uptake. The aquarium also worked with a Smithsonian research for a few years to try to catalogue and remove an invasive kelp species, though that project is no longer active. Additionally, Aquarium of the Bay has performed and collaborated in several research projects in relation to elasmobranchs, sevengill sharks, and Pacific angel sharks specifically.

Exhibits
The aquarium is divided into four exhibit areas.

Discover the Bay
This exhibit has a variety of satellite tanks containing animals such as moray eels, anchovies, rockfish, Monkeyfaced eels, perch, decorator crabs, urchins, garibaldi (the California state marine fish), and more.

Under the Bay
This is the aquarium's largest exhibit. It includes  of tunnels and features thousands of aquatic animals and other sea creatures such as jellies. The exhibit is a recreation of the San Francisco Bay.

Touch the Bay
This exhibit lets visitors touch several types of animals including bat rays, skates, leopard sharks, sea stars, anemones, and sea cucumbers. There are also terrestrial animals such as frogs, toads, newts, snakes, and skinks.

North American river otters
North American river otters are the most playful residents in the aquarium. Watch them swim, romp and wrestle. Experience the otter feeding and learn about their barrier free training.

References

External links

 
 
 
 

Aquaria in California
Buildings and structures in San Francisco
Tourist attractions in San Francisco
Environment of the San Francisco Bay Area
Fisherman's Wharf, San Francisco